Zach Muscat (born 22 August 1993) is a Maltese professional footballer who plays as a right back for Portuguese club Farense.

Club career
Muscat has played club football for Pietà Hotspurs, Birkirkara and Akragas. He moved to Arezzo in June 2016.

On 28 June 2018, Muscat signed a two-year contract with Pistoiese. On 31 January 2019, he moved to Portuguese club Olhanense on loan until the end of the season. He played just one game for Pistoiese in the 2019–20 season after returning from loan before on 1 September 2019 his contract was dissolved by mutual consent, and he returned to Olhanense on a permanent basis, before signing for Casa Pia.

He signed for Farense in August 2022.

International
He made his international debut for Malta in 2014.

International goals
Scores and results list Malta's goal tally first.

References

1993 births
Living people
Maltese footballers
Malta international footballers
Pietà Hotspurs F.C. players
Birkirkara F.C. players
S.S. Akragas Città dei Templi players
S.S. Arezzo players
U.S. Pistoiese 1921 players
S.C. Olhanense players
Casa Pia A.C. players
S.C. Farense players
Maltese Premier League players
Serie C players
Campeonato de Portugal (league) players
Liga Portugal 2 players
Association football fullbacks
Maltese expatriate footballers
Maltese expatriate sportspeople in Italy
Expatriate footballers in Italy
Expatriate footballers in Portugal
People from St. Julian's, Malta

Maltese expatriate sportspeople in Portugal